Coleophora stachi is a moth of the family Coleophoridae that is endemic to southern Russia, including Russian Far East and Lower Volga.

References

External links

stachi
Endemic fauna of Russia
Moths of Asia
Moths described in 1957